The 2022 Tour de Hongrie was the 43rd edition of the Tour de Hongrie, which took place between 11 and 15 May 2022. It was the eighth edition since the race's revival in 2015, and was rated as a 2.1 event as part of the 2022 UCI Europe Tour.

Teams
Eleven UCI WorldTeams, eight UCI ProTeams, two UCI Continental teams, and the Hungarian national team made up the twenty-three teams that participated in the race, with six riders each. With five riders,  is the only team to not field a maximum roster of six riders.

National Team

 Hungary

Route

Stages

Stage 1
11 May 2022 — Csákvár to Székesfehérvár,

Stage 2
12 May 2022 — Karcag to Hajdúszoboszló,

Stage 3
13 May 2022 — Sárospatak to Nyíregyháza,

Stage 4
14 May 2022 — Kazincbarcika to Kazincbarcika,

Stage 5
15 May 2022 — Miskolc to Gyöngyös-Kékestető,

Classification leadership table

In the 2022 Tour de Hongrie, four jerseys are awarded. The general classification is calculated by adding each cyclist's finishing times on each stage. The leader of the general classification receives a yellow jersey, sponsored by the Hungarian Tourism Agency (Aktív Magyarország), and the winner of this classification is considered the winner of the race.

The second classification is the points classification. Riders are awarded points for finishing in the top fifteen of each stage. Points are also on offer at intermediate sprints. The leader of the points classification wears a green jersey, sponsored by Škoda and Europcar.

There is also a mountains classification for which points are awarded for reaching the top of a climb before other riders. The climbs are categorized, in order of increasing difficulty, as third, second, and first-category. The leader of the mountains classification wears a red jersey, sponsored by Cofidis.

The fourth jersey is a classification for Hungarian riders, marked by a white jersey sponsored by the Hungarian Public Road Company (Magyar Közút) and the Hungarian Cycling Federation (Bringasport). Only Hungarian riders are eligible and they are ranked according to their placement in the general classification of the race.

The final classification is the team classification, for which the times of the best three cyclists in each team on each stage are added together; the leading team at the end of the race is the team with the lowest cumulative time.

 On stage 2, Jens Reynders, who was second in the points classification, wore the green jersey, because first-placed Olav Kooij wore the yellow jersey as the leader of the general classification.
 On stage 3, Rudy Barbier, who was second in the points classification, wore the green jersey, because first-placed Jens Reynders wore the yellow jersey as the leader of the general classification.
 On stage 5, Rudy Barbier, who was second in the points classification, wore the green jersey, because first-placed Fabio Jakobsen wore the yellow jersey as the leader of the general classification.

Final classification standings

General classification

Points classification

Mountains classification

Hungarian rider classification

Team classification

UCI point ranking
The event is in class ME 2.1 in Europe Tour Calendar. It is open for riders of the ME category and U23 and in accordance
with article 2.10.008 of the UCI regulations, points are awarded as follows for the UCI ranking:

See also

 2022 in men's road cycling
 2022 in sports

References

Sources

External links

2022
Tour de Hongrie
Tour de Hongrie
Tour de Hongrie